The Bristol Technical Education Center, or Bristol TEC, is a technical school located in Bristol, Connecticut. It is part of the Connecticut Technical High School System. Bristol TEC receives students from many nearby towns.

Unlike other Connecticut technical high schools, students attending Bristol TEC during high school also retain enrollment in their sending schools. If attending Bristol TEC during their senior year, students receive a diploma from their sending school and a training certificate from Bristol TEC.

Bristol TEC offers trade certificates in six technology areas: Automotive Technology, Culinary Arts, Electronics, HVAC/R (Heating, Ventilation, Air Conditioning and Refrigeration), Manufacturing, and Welding/Metal Fabrication. Students can also earn high school credits in English, math, and social studies. Students may be hired into entry-level positions while still in school via the Work-Based Learning program.

Bristol Technical Education Center is accredited by the New England Association of Schools and Colleges (NEASC) and the Council on Occupational Education (COE). Students applying to attend must complete an application found on the school's website, participate in a day of shadowing in their area of interest, and interview. Applicants are reviewed and notified of acceptance in April for the following school year.

References

Public high schools in Connecticut
Educational institutions accredited by the Council on Occupational Education